The Mainland is the main island of Shetland, Scotland. The island contains Shetland's only burgh, Lerwick, and is the centre of Shetland's ferry and air connections.

Geography
Mainland is the second most populous of the Scottish islands (only surpassed by Lewis and Harris), and had 18,765 residents in 2011 compared to 17,550 in 2001.

The mainland can be broadly divided into four sections:

The long southern peninsula, south of Lerwick, has a mixture of moorland and farmland and contains many important archaeological sites.
Bigton, Cunningsburgh, Sandwick, Scalloway, and Sumburgh
The Central Mainland has more farmland and some woodland plantations.
The West Mainland
Aith, Walls, and Sandness
The North Mainland – in particular the large Northmavine peninsula, connected to Mainland by a narrow isthmus at Mavis Grind – is wild, with much moorland and coastal cliffs. The North Mainland contains Sullom Voe, the location of an oil terminal providing an important source of employment for islanders.
Brae, North Roe, and Vidlin

See also
List of islands of Scotland
List of islands of the British Isles
Mainland, Orkney

References

External links

 
Islands of Shetland